Siantar Station is railway station located in Pematangsiantar, North Sumatra, Indonesia. The station is located at an altitude of +383.47 m. Siantar station is the station at the southernmost tip for branches of North Sumatran Main Line, connecting Tebing Tinggi to Pematangsiantar. At the end of this rail is Pertamina fuel depot, separated by a street that ran just above the underground pipes.

References

External links
 

pematangsiantar
Railway stations in North Sumatra
Cultural Properties of Indonesia in North Sumatra